The California Golden Bears football program represents the University of California, Berkeley in college football as a member of the Pac-12 Conference at the NCAA Division I FBS level. The team plays its home games at California Memorial Stadium and is coached by Justin Wilcox. Since beginning of play in 1886, the team has won five NCAA recognized national titles - 1920, 1921, 1922, 1923, and 1937 and 14 conference championships, the last one in 2006. It has also produced what are considered to be two of the oddest and most memorable plays in college football: Roy "Wrong Way" Riegels' fumble recovery at the 1929 Rose Bowl and The Play kickoff return in the 1982 Big Game.

Brief History

1880s through 1940s 

University of California fielded its first American Football team in 1882. In March 1892, the school played it first game against Stanford University. This was the first instance of the annual rivalry match – The Big Game, one of oldest college rivalries in the United States. In 1899, coached by Princeton alumni Garrett Cochran, Cal played a home against future legend Pop Warner and the emerging power of that period the Carlisle Indian Industrial School. Warner took up Cochran's challenge that his undefeated team could beat any East Coast opponent. The game took place in San Francisco on Christmas Day of that year.  Even though Carlisle dominated the majority of its season's opponents, it could only beat Cal 0–2, via a second-half safety. It was after that match that Cal became considered a worthy opponent to the East Coast teams. The 1900 Big Game is associated with the Thanksgiving Day disaster. The match took place in San Francisco, with between 500 and 1,000 men watching the game from the rooftop of an operating glass factory next to the sold-out city stadium. During the game, more than 100 fans fell through the factory's roof with the majority falling onto the factory's massive, operational furnace. In total 22 men, mostly boys were killed, with others severely injured.

Beginning in the 1890s, American football was becoming an increasingly violent sport. In 1905, there were 18 deaths reported as being caused by the play on the field. The next year, numerous rule changes were agreed upon by the majority of American schools. Berkeley, Stanford, along with other West Coast institutions decided to go in another direction, switching their primary sport to rugby, a sport they considered to be less dangerous. During these years, California wielded dominant teams, however the Bears were able to beat Stanford only three times. In 1915, due to various causes, including students frustration with those results, the university along with other west coast teams decided to return to American football.

1916 was the first year of the Pacific Coast Conference, which consisted of Cal, Washington, Oregon and Oregon Agricultural (which would later become Oregon State). It was also the year when Andy Smith, former coach of Purdue, became Cal's head coach. In 1920, Smith produced the first instance of what became known as The Wonder Teams. From 1920 to 1925, The Wonder Teams went 50 straight games without defeat, made three trips to the Rose Bowl, and won four NCAA recognised national titles - 1920, 1921, 1922, 1923. 1923 saw the opening of the California Memorial Stadium, which sat more than 73,000; several thousand more could watch the games from Tightwad Hill right above it. In January 1926, Andy Smith died at 42 years old, passing away from pneumonia. His death was unexpected and traumatic for the team and the whole university. His overall Cal record was 74-16-7.

The following year, Smith was succeeded by his former assistant coach Nibs Price. In 1927 and 1928 Price led the last two instances of Wonder Teams. Both teams were undefeated, with the 1928 team being invited to the 1929 Rose Bowl to play against Georgia Tech. An event in this game has become considered one of the stand-out moments in Rose Bowl history. Upon recovering a fumble, Cal's center Roy "the wrong way" Riegels inadvertently spun around, and ran the ball towards Cal's endzone instead of Georgia Tech's. Cal's quarterback was able to catch up with him right next to the endzone, where they were immediately tackled by Georgia Tech players. Price chose to punt, which was blocked for a safety, giving Georgia Tech a 2–0 lead. These turned out to be the decisive points of Cal's 7–8 loss.

In 1936 Nibs was replaced by Stub Ellison. Ellison lead Cal to three PCC championship titles, but will be most remembered for that the 1937 season's team and its virtually flawless performance. Because of its staunch defense, the 1937 squad that went to the Rose Bowl was coined "The Thunder Team." In its 11 wins, California scored 214 points and earned 7 shutouts, with its opponents could only score 33 points against it. The Thunder Team ended the season beating Alabama 13–0 in the Rose Bowl becoming that year's national champions. 1944 was Ellison's last season.

1950s through the 2000s 
  In 1947 former Northwestern coach Lynn "Pappy" Waldorf become the new head coach of Cal. During his first season the Bears went 9–1, with their only loss coming from conference champs - USC. Known as "Pappy's Boys", the Cal teams of 1947-1950 won 33 consecutive regular-season games, earning three PCC championships and three Rose Bowl berths. However, California lost all three Rose Bowls: 20–14 to Northwestern in 1949, 17–14 to Ohio State in 1950, and 14–6 to Michigan in 1951. Because of both Cal's return to greatness and Waldorf's great character, he became admired by both his players and his fans. He became known for addressing fans after every game from a balcony of the Memorial stadium. Like today, during those years a team could make multiple substitutions after every play. Waldorf was known for taking full advantage of this rule, using highly specialized players for key positions. In 1953, the league returned to its pre-WWII rules where only one substitution could be made per play. That year Cal went 7–3 to 4–4–2. The 1953 season is also remembered for recruiting scandal involving star freshman quarterback Ronnie Knox, who along with his father and high school coach were promised paid positions at the university. This was discovered prior to its happening and following investigation by both administration and the PCC conference, it was found that Waldorf was not directly involved in the scandal. Waldorf did not have a winning season after that year, retiring at the end of the 1956 season.  During the Waldorf era Cal went 67-32-4.

Cal's last Rose Bowl appearance was in 1958, when the team was coached by Pete Elliott. California went 6–1 in the PCC, but unfortunately lost the 1959 Rose Bowl to Iowa, 38 to 12.  That year's team was led by Joe Kapp, who is considered to be one of the greatest players in Cal history. Completely dedicated to his team and his university, he was known to push his teammates to perform beyond their limits and to fiercely intimidate his opponents. He would lead the team again in 1982 when he accepted the head coaching job at the university.

From 1964 to 1971, the team was led by head coach Ray Willsey, who had a losing career, but it was under him that Cal had one of the sternest defenses in its modern history. Known as The Bear Minimum, the 1968 team was let by Ed White an All-American and future member of College Hall of Fame. Relying on its defense Cal went 7–3–1 and ranking as high as 8th in the AP poll. It won 21–7 at Michigan and beat No. 10 Syracuse 43–0. Earning three shutouts, it held its opponents to 10.4 points a game. The Bear Minimum still holds Cal's records for opponents' average gains per play – 3.60, as well as the fewest rushing touchdowns per season – 5 (same as the Thunder Team). Its average yards per rush was 2.51 which is still second only to the Thunder Team with 2.50 yards per rush.

In the 1970s Cal had seven winning seasons, in 1975 it was led by coach Mike White, running back Chuck Muncie, and quarterback Joe Roth. The team led the nation in total offense, sharing the Pac-8 title with UCLA. Roth had a great start in 1976, however during the season his performance started to drop. Unknown to almost everyone, Roth was diagnosed with melanoma the most dangerous form of skin cancer. Only White and very few people at Cal knew about it. With Roth continuing to play he still had a strong season and was named an All-American. His last game was in January 1977 at an all-star game in Japan, he died several weeks later in Berkeley. In respect of his perseverance, and dedication to others, his former locker is dedicated in his honor and the annual home game against that year's opponent UCLA or USC, it is known as the Joe Roth Memorial Game, and an annual award bearing his name goes to the Cal player who best exemplifies Roth's courage, sportsmanship and attitude. Rich Campbell was a highly touted recruit out of Santa Teresa High School in San Jose, California and was Cal's starting quarterback for his sophomore through senior seasons, 1978-1980. Campbell was the recipient of the highly-valued Joe Roth Award in 1978, and Roth had actually helped to recruit Campbell to Cal. Campbell's success in the 1979 season as a junior led to his being featured on the cover of Street and Smith's Official Yearbook 1980 College Football Preview.  Stats for 1979, Cal's only bowl appearance between 1958 and 1990, show Campbell was 3rd in the nation in passing yards, 2nd in completions, 2nd in completion %, and Cal was 3rd in Team Passing Offense. In 1980, during his senior year at the University of California, he set a then-NCAA record with 43 completed passes in 53 attempts in a losing effort against the Florida Gators. Campbell was also an All-American his senior season, completing an NCAA best 71% of his passes. During his college career at Cal, he passed for 7174 yards, a record at the time. He is still fourth all time in both passing yards and completions at Cal, as well as 12th in touchdown passes. Among the greatest quarterbacks ever at Cal, he was the most accurate passer in Cal history, as well as in the top five in both yards per attempt at 7.7 and passing efficiency rating (min. 300 attempts) at 132.7.

The 1980s saw a return to mediocrity, with Cal posting only one winning season in the entire decade - 1982. The team was coached by Cal's former quarterback Joe Kapp and is most known for what happened in the annual Big Game against Stanford, which became known as The Play. Led by quarterback John Elway, Stanford made a field goal with only four seconds left in the game, resulting in the Cardinal taking a one-point lead. In the ensuing kickoff return, Cal used five laterals to score a touchdown and turn certain defeat into a 25–20 victory. The Play is considered to be one of the most memorable moments in college football history. Following that game, Cal did not have a winning season until 1990. That year's the team was led by head coach Bruce Snyder. It team finished 4th in the Pac-10, with even greater improvement coming in the following year. Bears finished the 1991 season in 2nd place in the conference, and were invited to play against the Clemson Tigers in the Florida Citrus Bowl. While the Tigers finished first in the Atlantic Coast Conference, they were thoroughly defeated by the Bears 37–13. Because of salary negotiation problems with Cal's new athletic director, Snyder left Cal for the Arizona State Sun Devils right after the Citrus Bowl. In 1993 and under Cal's next coach Keith Gilbertson, Cal was able to go 9-4 overall and 4–4 in the Pac-10, finishing in 5th place. The team did not have a better season during the next 10 years; in 2001 under coach Tom Holmoe, the Bears won only one game.

21st century 

California began a renaissance under Jeff Tedford who became head coach in 2002. Under him the Golden Bears posted eight consecutive winning seasons, a feat that had not been accomplished since the days of Pappy Waldorf. They also got their first win over Stanford in 8 years. After being ruled ineligible for a bowl game in 2002 due to academic infractions under Holmoe, the Bears went on to appear in seven straight bowl games. Led by future NFL superstar Aaron Rodgers, the 2004 Bears posted a 10–1 regular season record. Their only loss came against the eventual national champion USC. The team finished the regular season ranked No. 4 in the nation. Likely due to the intensive media and coach polling lobbying  conducted by Texas coach Mac Brown, Cal was not invited to the Rose Bowl. California was upset by lower ranked Texas Tech in that season's Holiday Bowl. In 2006, the bears finished the conference 7–2, sharing the Pac-10 title with USC. This was Cal's first Pac-10 championship since 1975. After that year, Tedford was not able to place the Bears higher than 4th place. His last year was 2012. Tedford left the Bears with the most bowl wins (five), conference wins (50), and games coached (139), in school's history. He also tied Pappy Waldorf for most Big Game wins - 7. During his tenure, California produced 40 players drafted by the NFL, including eight first-round picks.

At the end of 2012, Sonny Dykes was announced as the new head coach. The hire of Dykes was intended to improve the program's low graduation rate under Tedford. He was expected to bring significant offensive improvements with his up-tempo, pass-oriented Air Raid offense. However, his first year will be most remembered for the team's defensive failure. He became the first head of coach in Golden Bear history that could not defeat a single Division I NCAA opponent. Over his four years at Cal, Dykes failed to have a single winning season within the conference. Quarterback Jared Goff can be considered one of the few positive highlights of that period. In his three years under Dykes' Air Raid, he set 26 team records, including most season and career touchdowns, pass yardage gained, as well as the lowest percentage of interceptions.

2017 was Cal's first year under Justin Wilcox, whose defensive-minded approach could be considered a polar opposite of Dykes. That year the Bears had a losing season; however, they were able to beat No. 8 Washington State 37–3. In 2018, the Bears went 7–6 with Wilcox's defense being ranked No. 15 in the nation in total yards allowed. The highlight of the season was defeating USC for the first time since 2003, when Wilcox was the Cal linebackers coach. In the 2019 season, the Bears improved to an 8–5 record that included a win at the Redbox Bowl. They achieved their highest ranking since 2009 when they were ranked No. 15 after a 4–0 start to the season and also defeated Stanford in the Big Game for the first time since 2009.

Conference affiliations
 Independent (1886–1905, 1915)
 Pac-12 Conference (1916–present)
 Pacific Coast Conference (1916–1958)
 Athletic Association of Western Universities (1959–1967)
 Pacific-8 Conference (1968–1977)
 Pacific-10 Conference (1978–2010)
 Pac-12 Conference (2011–present)

Memorial Stadium 
California Memorial Stadium was built to honor Berkeley alumni, students, and other Californians who died in World War I and modeled after the Colosseum in Rome. It has been named one of the top college football stadiums by various publications, and it is also listed on the U.S. National Register of Historic Places. The stadium is located on the Hayward Fault, which passes directly under the playing field, nearly from goal post to goal post. A 1998 seismic safety study on the California campus gave the stadium a "poor" rating (meaning that the building represents an "appreciable life hazard" in an earthquake). The renovation started in the summer of 2010 and was completed by the beginning of the 2012 season.

Championships

National championships

California has won five (1920, 1921, 1922, 1923, 1937) national championships from NCAA-designated major selectors. California claims all five of these national championships.

Conference championships
California has won a total of 14 conference championships since 1916.

† Co-champions

Rivalries

Stanford

California's main rival is Stanford. The two schools participate in the Big Game every year, with the winner taking home the Stanford Axe. Stanford leads the series record at 60–45–10 through the 2021 season.

UCLA

California has an active rivalry with UCLA. The schools are the two largest public universities in the state of California and both have been part of the same conference for many years. UCLA leads the series 55–34–1 through the 2020 season.

Head coaches

† From 1906 to 1914, rugby was played instead of football. Cal's 13th coach was Oscar Taylor from 1906 to 1908. Cal's 14th coach, James Schaeffer, coached rugby from 1909 to 1914 and football in 1915.

Bowl games

California has participated in 24 bowl games, garnering a record of 12–11–1.

Current NFL players

As of January 11, 2023

Future opponents

Non-division conference opponents
Cal plays each of the other 5 schools in the North Division annually along with the two South Division schools based in California. Cal plays 2 other schools in the South Division as well. One from Arizona and either Utah or Colorado. This cycle repeats after eight seasons.

On July 10, 2020, the Pac-12 Conference announced their teams would play a conference-only schedule for the upcoming season due to the COVID-19 pandemic. On July 31, 2020, the new conference schedule was announced, with California adding an additional game at Arizona.

Non-conference opponents
Announced schedules as of August 4, 2020.

Notes

References

External links

 

 
American football teams established in 1886
1886 establishments in California